Daryl Sturdy (born 28 July 1940) is a Canadian rower. He competed at the 1964 Summer Olympics and the 1968 Summer Olympics.

References

1940 births
Living people
Canadian male rowers
Olympic rowers of Canada
Rowers at the 1964 Summer Olympics
Rowers at the 1968 Summer Olympics
Sportspeople from British Columbia
Pan American Games medalists in rowing
Pan American Games gold medalists for Canada
Pan American Games silver medalists for Canada
Rowers at the 1963 Pan American Games
Rowers at the 1967 Pan American Games